Thubro Tea Estate  is a tea garden in the Mirik CD block in the Mirik subdivision of the Darjeeling district in the Indian state of West Bengal.

Etymology
The name “Thurbo” is a variation of the Nepali word “Tombu” meaning tent. The British set up tents in this area when fighting the Nepalese in 1870.

History
Thurbo, a Darjeeling tea garden, was planted in 1872. It is now owned by the Goodricke Group, which owns such gardens as Margaret's Hope, Castleton and Thurbo, “some of the most famous tea gardens in the world”.

Geography

The Mechi flows on its northern side and the Rangbag on its south. Thubro enjoys typical hill climate, where temperatures reman low with less sunshine.

Note: The map alongside presents some of the notable locations in the subdivision. All places marked in the map are linked in the larger full screen map.

Economy
Thurbo teas carry rare fragrance and command premium prices.

The Goodricke Group
The Goodricke Group owns five tea estates in Darjeeling: Thurbo, Badamtam, Barnesbeg, Castleton and Margaret's Hope.

References

External links
 

Tea estates in Darjeeling district